Jacarezinho may refer to:

 Jacarezinho, Rio de Janeiro, Brazil
 Jacarezinho, Paraná, Brazil
 Roman Catholic Diocese of Jacarezinho, Paraná, Brazil